Joe Hancock (1926–1943) was an influential Quarter Horse sire in the early years of the American Quarter Horse Association (or AQHA).

Life

Joe Hancock was registered as number 455 in the American Quarter Horse Association (or AQHA). He was foaled most probably in 1926, although the dates are somewhat hazy. He was a brown stallion, registered as bred by an unknown breeder, but later research determined that his breeder was John Jackson Hancock. His sire was a son of Peter McCue named John Wilkens and his dam was a half Percheron mare, although the AQHA's stud book gives his dam as "unknown." John Wilkens was inbred to the Thoroughbred stallion Voltigeur, as well as being a descendant of the Thoroughbred Glencoe. When he was registered, he was owned by the Tom L. Burnett Estate in Fort Worth, Texas, which later became the 6666 Ranch.

Joe Hancock had a streak on his face and, when grown, stood 15.3 hands high. Unlike his sire, he had good feet.

Racing career 
Joe Hancock raced in match races for a number of years, although no official records of these races exist. At one point, there were advertisements run in the Fort Worth Star Telegram and the Daily Oklahoman stating that "Joe Hancock is open to the world, from standing start to ⅜ths of a mile." There were no folks willing to match their horses against Joe Hancock. All of Joe Hancock's racing took place before the formation of the AQHA in 1940.

Breeding record 
By the time the AQHA was founded, Joe Hancock was busy siring ranch horses on the 6666 Ranch. He sired seven foals that earned their Race Register of Merit with the AQHA. He also sired two foals that earned their Performance Register of Merit with the AQHA – Brown Joe Hancock and Red Man.

Death and honors 
Joe Hancock died in 1943 and in 1992 he was inducted into the AQHA Hall of Fame. In 2007 Western Horseman magazine chose Joe Hancock as number three on their list of top ten ranch horse bloodlines.

Pedigree

Notes

References

 All Breed Pedigree Database Pedigree of Joe Hancock retrieved on June 22, 2007
 American Quarter Horse Foundation – Joe Hancock accessed on September 1, 2017
 AQHA Hall of Fame accessed on September 1, 2017
 
 
 
 
 The 6666 Story retrieved July 4, 2007

Further reading

External links
 Joe Hancock at Foundation Horses
 Joe Hancock at Quarter Horse Directory

American Quarter Horse racehorses
American Quarter Horse sires
1926 racehorse births
1943 racehorse deaths